Guy L. Fithen (born 1962 in Oxford) is a British actor and screenwriter best known for his roles as a pirate.

Career
A graduate of the London Academy of Music and Dramatic Art, Fithen worked as a stage actor in the Royal Shakespeare Company, in particular as the Keeper of the Tower in Antony Sher's 1985 staging of William Shakespeare's Richard III.

His film career included roles as first mate Rhince in The Voyage of the Dawn Treader, an adaptation of C. S. Lewis's novel of the same name and third in the 1989 BBC miniseries The Chronicles of Narnia, and as the pirate Thatcher, playing alongside Gabriel Byrne in the 1990 Disney film Shipwrecked.

Filmography

References

External links

1962 births
Living people
Alumni of the London Academy of Music and Dramatic Art
English male screenwriters
English male stage actors
English male film actors
Male actors from Oxfordshire
People from Oxford